Michael or Mike Barber may refer to:

 Sir Michael Barber (educationist) (born 1955), British educationist
 Michael C. Barber (born 1954), Roman Catholic bishop of Oakland
 Michael Barber (chemist) (1934–1991), developer of fast atom bombardment
 Michael Barber (academic) (born 1947), Australian mathematician, physicist and academic
 Michael Barber (rapper) (born 1980), American rapper

Sportspeople
 Mike Barber (tight end) (born 1953), American football tight end and minister
 Mike Barber (linebacker) (born 1971), American football linebacker
 Michael Barber (wide receiver) (born 1967), American football wide receiver

See also
 Ray Barber (Michael Joseph Barbetta, 1923–2009), American singer
 Mikele Barber (born 1980), American track and field sprint athlete